Gessika Lemos (born 17 February 1983) is a Uruguayan former footballer who played as a forward. She has been a member of the Uruguay women's national team.

International career
Lemos capped for Uruguay at senior level during the 2003 South American Women's Football Championship.

References

1983 births
Living people
Uruguayan women's footballers
Women's association football forwards
Uruguay women's international footballers